Leopold Alexander Friedrich Arends (4 December 1817 in Rukiškis, Vilna Governorate (now Anykščiai district of Lithuania) – 22 December 1882, Berlin) was a German stenographer and inventor of a system of stenography extensively used on the Continent, especially in Sweden.

Bibliography
 Leopold Arends, "Das Wunderreich der Natur" (1858)
 Leopold Arends, "Vollständiger Leitfaden" (ed. 20, 1891)
 Rätzsch, "Das System Arends" (1884)

1817 births
1882 deaths
People from Anykščiai District Municipality
People from Vilkomirsky Uyezd
Creators of writing systems